Sowerby may refer to:

People 
Sowerby (surname)

Places 
Sowerby, North Yorkshire, England
Sowerby, Ontario, Canada in Huron Shores
Sowerby, West Yorkshire, England
Sowerby (UK Parliament constituency), which elected MPs to the British House of Commons 1885–1983
Inskip-with-Sowerby, the civil parish containing the village of Inskip, Lancashire, England
Temple Sowerby, a village in Cumbria
Sowerby Bridge, West Yorkshire, England
Sowerbyshire, West Yorkshire, England